Sefer may refer to:
 Sefer (Hebrew), a term for a book

People with the surname
Franjo Šefer (born 1905), Yugoslav tennis player
Bela Šefer, Yugoslav footballer playing in 1924

People with the forename
 Sefer Reis, Turkish privateer and Ottoman admiral
 Sefer Turan, Turkish journalist and author
 Hoca Sefer, 15th-century Ottoman captain
Sefer Daja (1897-1977), person from Tirana, Albania

See also